David 'Dave' Joseph S Hancock (1945-1993), was a male weightlifter who competed for England and Great Britain.

Weightlifting career
Hancock represented Great Britain in the 110 kg category at the 1972 Summer Olympics.

He represented England and won a silver medal in the -110 kg Combined, at the 1970 British Commonwealth Games in Edinburgh, Scotland.

Four years later he competed again for England at the 1974 British Commonwealth Games in Christchurch, New Zealand.

References

1945 births
1993 deaths
English male weightlifters
Commonwealth Games medallists in weightlifting
Commonwealth Games silver medallists for England
Weightlifters at the 1970 British Commonwealth Games
Weightlifters at the 1972 Summer Olympics
Weightlifters at the 1974 British Commonwealth Games
Olympic weightlifters of Great Britain
20th-century English people
Medallists at the 1970 British Commonwealth Games